Radiative Auger effect is a decay channel of an inner-shell atomic vacancy state, in which an x-ray photon is emitted accompanying simultaneous promotion of an electron into either a bound or a continuum state. Thus the transition energy is shared between the photon and the electron.
The effect was first observed by F. Bloch and P. A. Ross, with initial theoretical explanation by F. Bloch.
Later the effect has also been observed on defects in the solid-state, semiconductor quantum emitters, as well as two-dimensional electron gases. In the latter case, the effect is typically referred to as shake-up.

See also
Auger effect
Radiative transition

References

Atomic physics